West Virginia's 13th Senate district is one of 17 districts in the West Virginia Senate. It is currently represented by Democrat Bob Beach and Republican Mike Oliverio. All districts in the West Virginia Senate elect two members to staggered four-year terms.

Geography
District 13 is based in the city of Morgantown, covering parts of Marion and Monongalia Counties. Other communities in the district include Fairmont, Pleasant Valley, Barrackville, Monongah, Star City, Westover, and Cheat Lake.

The district is located entirely within West Virginia's 1st congressional district, and overlaps with the 49th, 50th, and 51st districts of the West Virginia House of Delegates. At around 260 square miles, it is the smallest district in the Senate. It borders the state of Pennsylvania.

Recent election results

2022

Historical election results

2020

2018

2016

2014

2012

Federal and statewide results in District 13

References

13
Marion County, West Virginia
Monongalia County, West Virginia